Nikephoros Blemmydes (Latinized as Nicephorus Blemmydes; , 1197–1272) was a 13th-century Byzantine author.

Biography
Blemmydes was born in 1197 in Constantinople as the second child of a physician. After the conquest of Constantinople by the forces of the Fourth Crusade in 1204, he migrated to Asia Minor. There, he received a liberal education in Prusa, Nicaea, Smyrna and Scamander. Blemmydes studied medicine, philosophy, theology, mathematics, astronomy, logic, and rhetoric. When he finally acquired a career as a cleric, he took an active part in the theological controversies between the Eastern Orthodox Church and the Roman Catholic Church, writing treatises on the Procession of the Holy Spirit, advocating the western usage. He was the tutor of the learned Theodore II Laskaris of the Nicaean Empire, and a great collector of classical texts. William of Rubruck reports that his benefactor, John III Doukas Vatatzes, owned a copy of the missing books from Ovid's Fasti. 

Blemmydes also founded a school where he taught students such as Prince Theodore II Laskaris and George Akropolites. In his later years, Blemmydes became a monk and retired to a monastery he built in Ephesus. He died in 1272.

Bibliography
Autobiographia (Curriculum Vitæ)
Epistula universalior
Epitome logica
Epitome physica
Expositio in Psalmos
De processione Spiritus Sancti
De regia pellice templo ejecta (On the Royal Concubine Expelled from the Temple)
De regis oficiis (On Royal Offices)
Laudatio Sancti Ioanni Evangelistae
Orationes de vitae fine (ΑΠΟΔΕΙΞΙΣ, ΟΤΙ ΟΥΧ ΩΡΙΣΤΑΙ ΤΟΥ ΚΑΘΕΚΑΣΤΟΝ Η ΖΩΗ. ΔΙΑΛΕΓΟΜΕΝΟΣ Ή ΠΕΡΙ ΤΟΥ ΟΡΟΥ)
Regia statua
Sermo ad monachos suos (Sermon to his monks)
De virtute et ascesi

References

Sources
 P. A. Agapitos, "Blemmydes, Laskaris and Philes," in Byzantinische Sprachkunst. Studien zur byzantinischen Literatur gewidmet Wolfram Hoerandner zum 65. Geburtstag. Hg. v. Martin Hinterberger und Elisabeth Schiffer. Berlin-New York, Walter de Gruyter, 2007 (Byzantinisches Archiv, 20), 6–19; Bildtafel I-II

External links
Catholic Encyclopedia article
New Works of Nicephorus Blemmydes
Blemmydes' Oratio I de processione Spiritus sancti (Letter to James, archbishop of Bulgaria)
Blemmydes' Oratio II de processione Spiritus sancti (Letter to Theodore Laskaris)

1197 births
1272 deaths
13th-century Byzantine monks
Autobiographers
Byzantine philosophers
People from Constantinople
Eastern Orthodox monks
Byzantine theologians
13th-century Byzantine writers
13th-century Eastern Orthodox theologians